is a Japanese pharmaceutical company headquartered in Tokyo, Japan. It has some 10,000 employees, among them about 1,500 in research. Eisai is listed on the Tokyo Stock Exchange and is a member of the Topix 100 and Nikkei 225 stock indices.

History 
Nihon Eisai Co. Ltd. was established in 1941.  In 1944, merger with Sakuragaoka Research Laboratory resulted in creation of Eisai Co. Ltd.  The American subsidiary of the company, Eisai Inc., was established in 1995.

On November 25, 1996, Eisai received approval from the United States Food and Drug Administration (USFDA) for Aricept (donepezil), a drug discovered in the company's labs and co-marketed with Pfizer.

Three years later in 1999, the company received USFDA approval for Aciphex (rabeprazole), a drug co-marketed with Johnson & Johnson.

In September 2006, the company acquired four oncology products from Ligand Pharmaceuticals.

In April 2007, Eisai acquired Exton, Pennsylvania-based Morphotek, a company developing therapeutic monoclonal antibodies for the treatment of cancer, rheumatoid arthritis, and infectious diseases.

In December 2007, Eisai acquired MGI Pharma, a company specializing in oncology, for US$3.9 billion. This event brought Dacogen (decitabine), Aloxi (palonosetron), Hexalen (altretamine) for ovarian cancer, and the Gliadel Wafer (carmustine) for brain tumors into the Eisai product portfolio.

In 2009, Eisai received the Corporate Award from the National Organization for Rare Disorders (NORD) for the development of Banzel.

Locations

Eisai Co., Ltd. is based in Tokyo, Japan, while its American subsidiary Eisai Inc. is headquartered in Nutley, New Jersey.  Eiasai Inc. is led by Ivan Cheung as CEO.  Eisai maintains medical research headquarters in Nutley as well as at locations in Japan, the United Kingdom, the Research Triangle in North Carolina, and Massachusetts where the Eisai Research Institute and the Genetics Guided Dementia Discovery (G2D2) institute are based.

The company has manufacturing sites in Japan, North Carolina (USA), Maryland (USA), Bogor (Indonesia), Suzhou (China), Tainan (Taiwan),  Visakhapatnam (India) and Hatfield, Hertfordshire (UK). Eisai has marketing operations in 19 European countries as well as the Asia-Pacific region.

Products
Some of the key products that Eisai produces or markets with partners include:

Aciphex/Pariet (rabeprazole) - Gastroesophageal reflux disease
Actonel (risedronic acid) - Osteoporosis (Japan)
Aloxi (palonosetron) - Chemotherapy-induced nausea and vomiting
Aricept (donepezil) - Mild to moderate dementia for Alzheimer's Disease patients
Banzel/Inovelon (rufinamide) - Seizures related to Lennox-Gastaut Syndrome
Belviq (lorcaserin) - Obesity
Dayvigo (lemborexant) - Insomnia
Fragmin (dalteparin) - Deep vein thrombosis and pulmonary embolism
Fycompa (perampanel) - Partial-onset seizures
Halaven (eribulin) - Metastatic breast cancer
Iomeron (iomeprol) - Non-ionic contrast medium
Methylcobal (methylcobalamin) - Peripheral neuropathy
Myonal (eperisone) - Muscle relaxant
Selbex (teprenone) - Gastric ulcers and gastritis
Zonegran (zonisamide) - Partial-onset seizures
Gliadel Wafer (carmustine) - Treatment for Brain Tumors
Lenvima (lenvatinib) - Thyroid Cancer or Kidney Cancer

Aricept
Aricept accounted for 40% of Eisai's revenue as of March 2010.  The main competitor to Aricept is a generic formulation from Ranbaxy Labs.  Eisai has pursued development of alternative formulations in order to extend the marketable lifetime of the product.

See also

 Biotech and pharmaceutical companies in the New York metropolitan area

References

External links
 
 
 
  Wiki collection of bibliographic works on Eisai

Life sciences industry
Pharmaceutical companies based in Tokyo
Companies listed on the Tokyo Stock Exchange
Pharmaceutical companies established in 1941
Japanese companies established in 1941
Japanese brands
Pharmaceutical companies based in New Jersey